"Voodoo Child" is a song written by Elvis Costello, James Ash, and Steve Davis and produced by Ash for Australian electronic rock band Rogue Traders' second album, Here Come the Drums (2005). It was the first single for the new member Natalie Bassingthwaighte. It was released as a CD single in Australia on 30 May 2005 as the first song released from the album. In 2006, it was released in the United Kingdom as a digital download and CD single.

The song samples the riff from Costello's "Pump It Up", and he receives credit in some printings of the album's liner notes. The song marks a move for Rogue Traders away from standard dance music and towards a more electro-punk sound. Upon its release, the song became a top-10 hit in Australia, New Zealand, and the United Kingdom. The music video, directed by Sam Bennetts and Mad Angel, was nominated for Best Video at the ARIA Music Awards of 2005.

Promotion and chart performance
In Australia, the song was released without the promotion of the new band member Natalie Bassingthwaighte because the band wanted to release it knowing that people were buying it because they liked the song, instead of buying it for "celebrity value" (Bassingthwaighte was starring in Neighbours at the time of the single's release).

"Voodoo Child" debuted at number 20 on the Australian ARIA Singles Chart and by its third week had ascended into the top 10, peaking at number nine. In its eighth week, it ascended to its peak position at number four and was certified Platinum by ARIA. The song spent an overall 21 weeks on the chart, and is to date the group's most successful single. In New Zealand, "Voodoo Child" also debuted at number 20, becoming the group's first entry and so far only on the chart. It peaked at number seven for two consecutive weeks there, becoming the group's first top-10 hit there, and spent a total of 16 weeks on the chart. It was later released in the UK in July 2006, and debuted at number 18 based on download sales one week prior to its physical release. "Voodoo Child" ascended and peaked at number three the following week, to become the group's first and so far only top-three hit. The song has also peaked at number 15 in Ireland, becoming the group's first top-20 hit there.

Track listings
Australian CD single
 "Voodoo Child" – 3:57
 "Voodoo Child" (James Ash Lektric remix) – 5:38
 "Voodoo Child" (12-inch mix) – 6:58
 "Voodoo Child" (Fuzzy Hair remix) – 6:09
 "Voodoo Child" (Fuzzy Hair instrumental) – 6:23

UK CD1
 "Voodoo Child" (radio edit)
 "Voodoo Child" (Fuzzy Hair remix)

UK CD2
 "Voodoo Child" (radio edit)
 "Voodoo Child" (Tom Neville Vox mix)
 "Voodoo Child" (12-inch mix)
 "Voodoo Child" (CD-Rom video)

German maxi-CD single
 "Voodoo Child" (radio edit)
 "Voodoo Child" (James Ash Lektric remix)
 "Voodoo Child" (12-inch mix simple track)
 "Voodoo Child" (Tom Neville Vox remix)
 "Voodoo Child" (Fuzzy Hair remix)

Charts

Weekly charts

Year-end charts

Certifications

Release history

References

2005 singles
2005 songs
Animated music videos
Ariola Records singles
Columbia Records singles
Rogue Traders songs
Songs written by Elvis Costello
Songs written by James Ash
Sony BMG singles